Hydrindantin is an organic chemical thought to be involved with the ninhydrin test for amines.

References

Reagents for organic chemistry
Vicinal diols
Indandiones